Lansdale Silk Hosiery Compy-Interstate Hosiery Mills, Inc. is a historic American silk mill complex located at Lansdale, Montgomery County, Pennsylvania. It was built in four interconnected phases between 1922 and 1961, with the original 1922 building (with additions), as well as the 1932 building, included in the listing.  The original building was built in 1922, with additions constructed in 1926, 1928, and 1929. The building is two stories tall, and sits on a brownstone foundation. The 1932 building is a three-story, red brick building with a flat roof and brick parapet.  The complex produced women's full-fashioned silk hosiery.  It was occupied by textile manufacturers into the 1970s.

It was added to the National Register of Historic Places in 2004.

References

Industrial buildings and structures on the National Register of Historic Places in Pennsylvania
Industrial buildings completed in 1922
Buildings and structures in Montgomery County, Pennsylvania
Hosiery
Silk mills in the United States
National Register of Historic Places in Montgomery County, Pennsylvania
Lansdale, Pennsylvania